Hirono may refer to:

People
Hirono (surname), a Japanese surname
Mazie Hirono, current Democratic United States Senator from the state of Hawaii.

Places
Hirono, Fukushima, Japan
Hirono, Iwate, Japan
Hirono Station (Fukushima), a stop on the West Japan Railway's Fukuchiyama Line
Hirono Station (Hyogo), a stop on the Kobe Electric Railway's Sanda Line
Hirono Power Station, a fossil-fuel power station operated by Tepco